The 1923 Maryland Aggies football team was an American football team that represented the University of Maryland in the Southern Conference during the 1923 college football season. In their 13th season under head coach Curley Byrd, the Aggies compiled a 7–2–1 record (2–1 in conference), finished seventh in the conference, and outscored opponents by a total of 214 to 56. The team shutout five of its opponents and held Johns Hopkins and Catholic to just six points apiece.

In 1923, the original Byrd Stadium, for which coach Byrd had petitioned for funding, was completed at a cost of $60,000 with a maximum capacity of 10,000. Burton Shipley, former quarterback and future basketball coach, was an assistant coach.  The only losses came at Yale and against Virginia Tech. Maryland led Yale, 14–12, at halftime, but a referee ruled incomplete a drop kick that Byrd claimed was good by a "country mile". Yale won the game, 16–14. Mainly for his performance against Yale and Penn, end Bill "Zeke" Supplee was named an All-American by the Associated Press. He was the first Maryland player honored as such.

Schedule

References

Maryland
Maryland Terrapins football seasons
Maryland Aggies football